Bruce Billings (born November 18, 1985) is an American former professional baseball pitcher. He played in Major League Baseball (MLB) for the Colorado Rockies, Oakland Athletics, and New York Yankees. He also pitched in the Chinese Professional Baseball League (CPBL) for the Uni-President 7-Eleven Lions and Fubon Guardians.

Early life and college
Billings is the son of Bruce and Emily. Billings attended the San Diego School of Creative and Performing Arts (SDSCPA) and Samuel F. B. Morse High School and San Diego State University who played for the SDSU baseball team as a short reliever in 2004 and a starter in 2005 and 2006. In 2005, he played collegiate summer baseball with the Wareham Gatemen of the Cape Cod Baseball League. While at SDSU, Bruce Billings became the school's all-time strikeout leader (Stephen Strasberg went on the break Billings record before leaving for professional baseball). Billings was drafted by the Philadelphia Phillies in the 2006 MLB June Amateur Draft in the 31st round, but decided to stay one more year at San Diego State. Billings was again drafted by the Colorado Rockies in the 30th round in the 2007 MLB June Amateur Draft, 912th overall, and he accepted the deal.

Playing career

Minor leagues
Billings started his minor league career with the Tri-City Dust Devils where he went 4–2 in 15 starts. In 2008 with the Asheville Tourists, Billings threw a no-hitter against the Lakewood BlueClaws. Billings started to convert to a reliever in 2010 with Tulsa with more than half of his appearances being in relief. Billings was also a mid-season All Star with Tulsa. Billings did not pitch one start in 2011 with Colorado Springs before being promoted.

While in AA Tulsa, he set the team record for most consecutive scoreless innings at 38. (https://www.milb.com/tulsa/news/print/sitting-down-with-bruce-billings/c-12810486)

Colorado Rockies
On May 25, 2011, Billings was recalled to the majors when Jorge de la Rosa being placed on the 15-day disabled list with a tear of the ulnar collateral ligament in his left elbow.

On May 27, Billings made his major league debut in relief of Matt Daley. Billings pitched the 8th and the 9th innings in a 10–3 loss to the St. Louis Cardinals, giving up 5 hits and 1 run, while recording no strikeouts.

Oakland Athletics
Billings and a player to be named later were traded to the Oakland Athletics for Mark Ellis on June 30, 2011. He pitched five innings in three games for the Athletics, allowing seven runs (all of which scored in one outing against the New York Yankees in a rain delayed game). He spent the next two seasons with the Sacramento River Cats in AAA.
While in AAA for the Oakland A's, Billings was voted Most Valuable Pitcher in 2012, and was runner up in 2013 before electing free agency in 2014.

New York Yankees
Billings signed a minor league deal with the New York Yankees in December 2013. He appeared for the AAA Scranton/Wilkes-Barre RailRiders and one for the Yankees, where he allowed four runs in four innings, while also recording 7 strikeouts. After the game, he found a muscle hernia in his forearm (he was placed on the disabled list afterward). He was designated for assignment on July 22, 2014. He was released on August 2.

Los Angeles Dodgers
On August 7, 2014, he signed a minor league contract with the Los Angeles Dodgers and reported to the AAA Albuquerque Isotopes. He appeared in five games for the Isotopes, all as a relief pitcher and was 1–1 with a 6.75 ERA. He became a free agent at the end of the 2014 season.

Washington Nationals
On November 21, 2014, the Washington Nationals signed Billings to a minor league deal with an invitation to spring training. In AAA Syracuse, he went 8-5 while posting a 3.63 ERA. He recorded 90 strikeouts in 121.1 innings with a WHIP of 1.26. He elected free agency on November 6, 2015.

Uni-President 7-Eleven Lions 
In February 2016, he signed with the Uni-President 7-Eleven Lions, a professional baseball team based in Taiwan. He joined the spring training in  mid-February with a former MLB players, Felix Pie, and Jair Jurrjens. He became the ACE of staff over the course of the season, leading the team in Wins(11), Strikeouts, innings, complete games, and Whip. Here is an article where Billings is interviewed about the league dynamics for pitchers (http://www.cpblenglish.com/2016/07/uni-lions-bruce-billings-is-in.html?m=1) ( He re-signed with the team for the 2017 season, again leading the team in WINs, strikeouts, innings and Whip. He became a free agent following the season because the team did not want to guarantee him a contract through the season.

Fubon Guardians 
On March 4, 2018, Billings signed with the Fubon Guardians of the Chinese Professional Baseball League. Billings recorded a 2–9 record and 5.72 ERA in 20 appearances with Fubon.

Coaching career
In late 2018, Billings announced his retirement in order to pursue a coaching opportunity in the Philadelphia Phillies organization.

On December 14, 2020, Billings accepted a coaching job with the Fubon Guardians of the Chinese Professional Baseball League (CPBL). On November 17, 2021, it was announced that Billings had reportedly resigned from his position due to an altercation he had had with Fubon manager Hong I-chung.

References

External links

San Diego State Aztecs bio

1985 births
Living people
Colorado Rockies players
Oakland Athletics players
New York Yankees players
San Diego State Aztecs baseball players
Wareham Gatemen players
Tri-City Dust Devils players
Asheville Tourists players
Modesto Nuts players
Tulsa Drillers players
Scottsdale Scorpions players
Colorado Springs Sky Sox players
Sacramento River Cats players
Midland RockHounds players
Estrellas Orientales players
American expatriate baseball players in the Dominican Republic
Scranton/Wilkes-Barre RailRiders players
Trenton Thunder players
Major League Baseball pitchers
Baseball players from San Diego
Albuquerque Isotopes players
Syracuse Chiefs players
Uni-President 7-Eleven Lions players
Fubon Guardians players
Baseball coaches from California
Minor league baseball coaches